Zeferina (fl. 1826) was a female leader of an 1826 slave revolt, the Revolt of Quilombo do Urubu, outside Salvador, Bahia.

Early life and enslavement 
Zeferina was originally from Angola, but was brought to Brazil as a slave.

Revolt of Quilombo do Urubu 

In Piraja, in the outskirts of Salvador in Bahia, fugitive slaves and indigenous Tupinamba created a community in the woods called the Quilombo do Urubu. They grew their own food and performed candomble rituals.  From here, they conducted constant offensives to free enslaved people. One of the leaders of a December 1826 revolt was Zeferina. 
  On December 15, the rebels  captured a village in Cabula, a neighboring district to Piraja. On December 17, thirty soldiers from Salvador were sent to put down the rebellion. Armed with "bows and arrows, knives, pitchforks, hatchets and spears," the rebels won the first engagement with the soldiers. However, when reinforcements arrived, the rebels were defeated.

Capture 
After being arrested, Zeferina was forced to confess the nature of the rebels' plans. Afterwards, she, along with another leader named Antonio, was condemned to forced labor for her role in the uprising.

In popular culture 
Brazilian artist Dalton Paula's painting Zeferina depicts her.

See also
 Slave revolts in Brazil

References

Bibliography
 

Year of birth unknown
19th-century deaths
Year of death unknown
Brazilian rebel slaves
Women warriors
19th-century Brazilian women
Afro-Brazilian women